Mohaupt Point is the eastern point of Currituck Island, in the Highjump Archipelago, Antarctica. The name "Mohaupt Island" was given by Advisory Committee on Antarctic Names (US-ACAN) in 1956 to the northern portion of Currituck Island, then thought to be a separate feature. Subsequent Soviet expeditions in 1956–57 found that feature to be part of Currituck Island and US-ACAN has reapplied the name to the point described. It is named for H.E. Mohaupt, an air crewman on U.S. Navy Operation Highjump photographic flights in this area in 1946–47.

References

Headlands of Queen Mary Land